Cyperus distinctus is a species of sedge that is endemic to North America.

The species was first formally described by the botanist Ernst Gottlieb von Steudel in 1854.

See also
 List of Cyperus species

References

distinctus
Plants described in 1854
Taxa named by Ernst Gottlieb von Steudel
Flora of Louisiana
Flora of Florida
Flora of Georgia (U.S. state)
Flora of South Carolina
Flora of the Bahamas
Flora without expected TNC conservation status